The 1934 Kansas Jayhawks football team represented the University of Kansas in the Big Six Conference during the 1934 college football season. In their third season under head coach Adrian Lindsey, the Jayhawks compiled a 3–4–3 record (2–2–1 against conference opponents), finished in fourth place in the conference, and outscored opponents by a combined total of 74 to 48. They played their home games at Memorial Stadium in Lawrence, Kansas. Ole Nesmith was the team captain.

Schedule

References

Kansas
Kansas Jayhawks football seasons
Kansas Jayhawks football